CANDLES Holocaust Museum and Education Center ("Children of Auschwitz Nazi Deadly Lab Experiments Survivors") is a museum in Terre Haute, Indiana, which educates the public about the Holocaust. The museum was founded by Holocaust survivor Eva Mozes Kor, who with her twin sister Miriam was subjected to human experimentation under Josef Mengele at Auschwitz. The museum tells the story of the genocide from Kor's perspective. It has been the center of controversy due to Kor's belief that Nazis should be forgiven for the crimes of the Holocaust as a way for Jews to free themselves from victimization. It was firebombed by an unknown arsonist in 2003, and reopened two years later.

External links 

 Official Website
 CANDLES Museum on YouTube

References

Buildings and structures in Terre Haute, Indiana
Museums established in 1995
Museums in Vigo County, Indiana
Holocaust museums in the United States
History museums in Indiana
Tourist attractions in Terre Haute, Indiana